Action Progressive Institute, also known as Action Secondary Technical School and Action Senior High School, is an educational institution for secondary and technical education located in Madina Estate in the Greater Accra Region, Ghana.

See also
 List of schools in Ghana
 List of senior secondary schools in Ghana

References

Education in Accra